WVOI may refer to:

 WVOI (FM), a radio station (91.5 FM) licensed to serve Everglades City, Florida, United States; see List of radio stations in Florida
 WVOI (AM), a defunct radio station (1480 AM) formerly licensed to serve Marco Island, Florida